William Herbert, 1st Marquess of Powis, PC KG
(16262 June 1696) was an English nobleman, best remembered for his suffering during the Popish Plot. He succeeded his father as 3rd Baron Powis in 1667 and was created Earl of Powis in 1674 by King Charles II and Viscount Montgomery, of the Town of Montgomery, and Marquess of Powis in 1687 by King James II, having been appointed to the Privy Council in 1686.

Early life
He was the only son of Percy Herbert, 2nd Baron Powis and the former Elizabeth Craven. His only sibling was Mary Herbert, who married George Talbot, Lord Talbot, eldest son and heir apparent of John Talbot, 10th Earl of Shrewsbury.

His paternal grandparents were William Herbert, 1st Baron Powis and the former Lady Eleanor Percy (third daughter of Henry Percy, 8th Earl of Northumberland). His mother was the eldest surviving daughter of Sir William Craven, Lord Mayor of London, and a sister to Mary Craven (wife of Thomas Coventry, 2nd Baron Coventry), William Craven, 1st Earl of Craven and John Craven, 1st Baron Craven of Ryton.

Career
A cousin of the 1st Baron Herbert of Cherbury, Powis was, together with his wife, one of the leaders of the Roman Catholic party. He was one of the "Five Catholic Lords"  falsely accused by Titus Oates in the Popish Plot of conspiring to kill the King and as a result spent six years in the Tower of London awaiting trial; his wife's desperate efforts to free him led her to fabricate the "Meal-Tub plot" for which she narrowly escaped being convicted for treason herself. Powis was finally freed in 1684. 

He remained faithful to the deposed King James after the Glorious Revolution of 1688. It was he who spirited away Queen Mary and the infant James, Prince of Wales, and took them into their French exile.  As a reward, he was created "Duke of Powis" and "Marquess of Montgomery" in the Jacobite Peerage by King James.

In 1690, Powis landed in Ireland with James, where he acted as one of his principal advisers. James appointed him to his Irish Privy Council and made him Lord Chamberlain. He remained in Ireland until the king's flight back to France after the Battle of the Boyne, and settled again at the exiled Jacobite Court at St Germain. Powis was a prominent figure in the Jacobite Court, serving as Lord Steward and Lord Chamberlain of the household, but he seems to have been rather marginal in the king's counsels. His wife continued as Principal Lady of the Bedchamber to Queen Mary of Modena and Royal Governess to James, Prince of Wales until her death on 11 March 1691. 

James made Powis a Knight of the Garter in April 1692. Nevertheless, others exercised more influence at Court as Powis struggled to maintain the dignity of a royal household on an insufficient income. Having lost estates valued at £10,000 a year, he had given up more than most for the Jacobite cause.

Personal life
In July 1654, Herbert married Lady Elizabeth Somerset (–1691), a daughter of Edward Somerset, 2nd Marquess of Worcester. Together, they had six children, a son and heir and five daughters, one of whom, Winifred, married William Maxwell, 5th Earl of Nithsdale, who was condemned to death for high treason for participating in the Jacobite rising of 1715. Lady Nithsdale famously organised her husband's escape from the Tower of London.

He died, aged about seventy, on 2 June 1696, after a riding accident in St Germain, and was buried there the next day. He was succeeded by his only son William Herbert, Viscount Montgomery (Jacobite Marquess of Montgomery), as second Marquess of Powis and (Jacobite second Duke of Powis) (1665–1745), who was later jailed in the Tower as a Jacobite and fought a long battle in the courts to retain some of his property, resulting in the restoration of his family's estates. He was relieved of the attainder placed on his father and was restored to the forfeited peerages in the rank of marquess in 1722.

Issue

References

External links

 William Herbert, 1st Marquess and 1st Duke of Powis at the National Portrait Gallery, London

|-

|-

|-

1626 births
1696 deaths
Dukes in the Jacobite peerage
William Herbert, 01st Marquess of Powis
Lord-Lieutenants of Cheshire
Members of the Privy Council of England
Members of the Privy Council of Ireland
Peers created by James II (1689–1701)
Victims of the Popish Plot
Herbert
1
Earls of Powis
Impeached British officials
Knights of the Garter